District-level town (thị xã), a type of second tier subdivision of Vietnam is divided into 713 units along with urban district, district, municipal city, and provincial city have equal status. Also by virtue of Decree No. 42/2009/ND-CP, town are officially classified into Class-3 or Class-4.

The towns may only be a capital of a province, but not of a municipality as the Second Tier unit. At the Third Tier, Town is divided into wards and communes.

Most provincial capitals were once towns, but now most of them have become provincial cities.

District level 
In Vietnam, there are other kinds of district-level urban subdivision: urban districts, districts and provincial cities. The urban districts is within urban and only consists of wards, but provincial cities and towns can consist of the wards (within urban) and communes (within suburban). Towns are similar with provincial cities, but towns are smaller than provincial cities in population density. Moreover, municipality can includes  towns (Sơn Tây (Hanoi)), even municipal cities.

The type town is categorized as urban and its residents is classified as urban population, although there may still be a part of residents living in agriculture. Main economical activities in town included industry, services and business.

Upgrade and downgrade 
Regularly, a commune-level town or township can be upgraded to a district-level town or town, and district-level towns can develop into provincial cities. 
 
But the district-level town can also be downgraded to a district capitals, especially when there is a merger of the provinces. That are the cases of the An Lộc (provincial capital of former Bình Long Province), Sông Cầu (formerly the provincial capital of Phú Yên Province) ...

Some district-level towns were downgraded into commune-level towns for some time and then be re-established, as Nghĩa Lộ, Bắc Cạn, Đồ Sơn (from 2007, became urban district of Đồ Sơn), Phúc Yên, Hà Tiên, Vị Thanh, Gia Nghĩa.

When a district-level town is downgraded, the urban become a commune-level town, and the suburban is merged into other districts or established rural communes. Some district-level towns have become commune-level towns and not re-established, so far as: Đô Lương, Tiên Yên, Ninh Giang, Cát Bà, Vĩnh An of Đồng Nai Province.

There is a rare case: Phan Rang as district-level town is divided into two commune-level towns, Phan Rang and Tháp Chàm in 1977. Each commune-level town belonged to a county (Ninh Hải and An Sơn), and in 1981 the two commune-level towns was merged and re-established as county-level town named Phan Rang–Tháp Chàm (now as provincial city).

Kiến An, a former district-level town, located in a municipality in Hải Phòng from 1962 to 1980, later downgraded into a commune-level town and was recovered between from 1988 to 1994 and is now an urban district of Hải Phòng.

Đồ Sơn ever (after 1994) was the only district-level town within a municipality (Hải Phòng), until September 12, 2007 it became the new urban district of Hải Phòng.

Sơn Tây is a district-level town governed under Hanoi in the period 1978 to 1991, then  merged into Hà Tây Province. August 2007 this district-level town was upgraded into provincial city. In 2008 Hà Tây Province was merged into Hanoi, Sơn Tây was moved back into district-level town.

List of district-level towns

See also
 Mueang

References

Subdivisions of Vietnam
District
Vietnam 1